Duthil is a surname. Notable people with the surname include:

Robert Duthil (1899–1967), French pole vaulter
Rudy Duthil (born 1982), American advertising executive

See also
Duthie